Avedon is a surname. Notable people with the surname include:

 Barbara Avedon (20th century), American television writer
 Doe Avedon (1925–2011), American model
 Gregg Avedon (born 1965), American model
 Michael Avedon (born 1991), American photographer
 Richard Avedon (1923–2004), American photographer